The 120 members of the eighth Knesset were elected on 31 December 1973. The breakdown by party was as follows:
Alignment: 51
Likud: 39
National Religious Party: 10
Religious Torah Front: 5
Independent Liberals: 4 
Rakah: 4
Ratz: 3
Progress and Development: 2 
Moked: 1
Arab List for Bedouins and Villagers: 1

The eighth Knesset was sworn in on 21 January 1974.

List of members

Replacements

External links
Members of the Eighth Knesset Knesset website

 
08